Borgloon is a city and municipality located in the Belgian province of Limburg. On January 1, 2006, Borgloon had a total population of 10,697. The total area is 51.12 km2 (19.74 sq mi) which gives a population density of 209 inhabitants per km2 (514/sq mi). Borgloon gave its name to the former county of Loon and was its capital until 1200.

The municipality includes the following 13 sub-municipalities: Bommershoven, Borgloon proper, Broekom, Gors-Opleeuw, Gotem, Groot-Loon, Hendrieken, Hoepertingen, Jesseren, Kerniel, Kuttekoven, Rijkel, and Voort.

History

References

External links
 
  

Municipalities of Limburg (Belgium)